Abbie Cobb is an American actress and author. She is known for her recurring roles as Emily Bradford on 90210 and as Kimantha on Suburgatory.

Life and career
Abbie Cobb was born in Papillion, Nebraska. She became interested in acting after watching a Shirley Temple movie marathon in the third grade. She built her acting experience in high school before moving to Los Angeles to book a number of stage productions. While in Los Angeles, she starred in local productions of Othello, Spring Awakening and The Toxic Avenger.

In 2009, she received her first screen role as A.J. in the 2010 Disney Channel original film Starstruck. She also had small role in the 2009 film The Missing Person. Her other acting credits include The Mentalist, Jonas, Medium, CSI: Miami, Pair of Kings, Imagination Movers, Big Time Rush, American Horror Story and the Disney Channel original film Good Luck Charlie, It's Christmas! (2011).

From 2011 to 2013, she had a recurring role as Emily Bradford on The CW series 90210. She almost did not land the role, because of her close resemblance to fellow 90210 actress Jennie Garth. Her hair was dyed a dark color so she would be less like Garth.

In 2011, Cobb wrote her first book entitled Stuck on a Ferris Wheel, a guide book to assist up-and-coming actors.

From 2012 to 2014, Cobb had a recurring role as Kimantha on the ABC sitcom Suburgatory.

After years of being told how much she looks like Jennie Garth, particularly during Garth's time on Beverly Hills, 90210, it was announced in July 2015 that Cobb was cast to play Garth in the Lifetime television film The Unauthorized Beverly Hills, 90210 Story. It premiered on October 3, 2015.

Filmography

Film

Television

References

External links

21st-century American actresses
Actresses from Nebraska
American film actresses
American stage actresses
American television actresses
American women writers
Living people
People from Papillion, Nebraska
Writers from Nebraska
Year of birth missing (living people)